Baron Ashdown may refer to:

 Arnold Silverstone, Baron Ashdown (19111977), British property developer and life peer
 Paddy Ashdown (19412018), formally Jeremy John Durham Ashdown, Baron Ashdown of Norton-sub-Hamdon, British politician, former leader of the Liberal Democrats

Noble titles created in 1975